Kru Interactive (now known as Nexon Inc.) is among the pioneers of online gaming and MMORPGs. Its headquarters is located in Santa Clara, California.

KRU or Kru Interactive
The South Korea-based game company made a name for itself in the early 1990s. Kru launched Nexus: The Kingdom of the Winds in 1997, Dark Ages in 1999. Shattered Galaxy, the award winning and first massive online RTS game, was introduced in 2001.  The company has recently expanded into other Asian countries, notably Japan, Malaysia, and Singapore; along with the United States. For a short time, Shattered Galaxy was sold in stores in the United States but never sold well because it was offered for free in a long-term open beta and then made available as a pay for play, only four months after commercial launch, from the Shattered Galaxy website. Shattered Galaxy has also been awarded the Seumas McNally Grand Prize, Audience Choice Awards, Technical Excellence Award, and Best Game Design at the 2001 Independent Games Festival Awards.

Nexon has also released a few unsuccessful games to the North American audience in beta form which have since been dropped. They include Elemental Saga, QuizQuiz and Elancia. QuizQuiz never left beta stage in North America but was later released through the Singapore division of Nexon, NexonAsia in an English version. QuizQuiz has since evolved into the exclusively Korean and Japanese online game Q-Play, while Elemental Saga was eventually cancelled.  NEXON has several games exclusively available to Korean players such as Elancia and Crazy Arcade..

External links
Kru Interactive
 http://www.kru.com/about.html
 http://www.nexon.net/corporate/about-nexon/

Video game companies of the United States
Nexon
Companies based in Santa Clara, California
Video game companies established in 1994
Video game development companies